M. A. Anderson (September 15, 1893 – March 8, 1958) was an American cinematographer. He worked for the Poverty Row studio Chesterfield Pictures during the 1930s.

Partial filmography
 South of Panama (1928)
 Oklahoma Cyclone (1930)
 Lotus Lady (1930)
 Night Life in Reno (1931)
 Forbidden Company (1932)
 The Secrets of Wu Sin (1932)
 By Appointment Only (1933)
 Twin Husbands (1933)
 In the Money  (1933)
 Dance Girl Dance  (1933)
 Cross Streets (1934)
 The Ghost Walks (1934)
 The Quitter (1934)
 Sons of Steel (1934)
 Symphony of Living (1935)
 False Pretenses (1935)
 The Dark Hour (1936)
 August Weekend (1936)
 Slander House (1938)

References

Bibliography
 Michael R. Pitts. Poverty Row Studios, 1929–1940: An Illustrated History of 55 Independent Film Companies, with a Filmography for Each. McFarland & Company, 2005.

External links

1893 births
1958 deaths
American cinematographers
People from Chicago